The 2015–16 Leyton Orient F.C. season was the 117th season in the history of Leyton Orient Football Club, their 100th in the Football League, and the first season of their return to the fourth tier of the English football league system.

Transfers

Transfers in

Total spending:  £20,000

Transfers out

Total income:  £25,000

Loans in

Loans out

Results

Pre-season friendlies
On 1 June 2015, Leyton Orient announced their first two pre-season friendlies against Braintree Town and Woking. A third friendly against Colchester United was added to the schedule. On 1 July 2015, Leyton Orient announced they will face Huddersfield Town during their stay in Spain. On 8 July 2015, Orient confirmed a friendly away to Bishop's Stortford. On 15 July 2015, Leyton Orient announced they will face Middlesbrough in a behind-closed-doors friendly. On 24 July 2015, O's announced a friendly against Southend United.

League Two

On 17 June 2015, the fixtures for the forthcoming season were announced.

FA Cup

League Cup

On 16 June 2015, the first round draw was made, Leyton Orient were drawn away against Milton Keynes Dons.

Football League Trophy

On 8 August 2015, live on Soccer AM the draw for the first round of the Football League Trophy was drawn by Toni Duggan and Alex Scott. O's will travel to Luton Town.

League table

2015–16 squad statistics

|-
|colspan="12"|Players who left the club during the season

|-
|colspan="12"|Out on Loan

References

Leyton Orient F.C. seasons
Leyton Orient